Liarea is a genus of land snails with an operculum, terrestrial gastropod molluscs in the subfamily Liareinae.

Species

The following species are recognised in the genus Liarea:
 Liarea aupouria Powell, 1954
 Liarea bicarinata (Suter, 1907)
 Liarea egea (Gray, 1850)
 Liarea hochstetteri (Pfeiffer, 1861)
 Liarea lepida (Suter, 1904)
 Liarea ornata Powell, 1954
 Liarea turriculata (Pfeiffer, 1855)

References

Pupinidae